Rashida Marie Beal (born November 18, 1994) is an American professional soccer player, who plays as a defender for Kdz. Ereğli Belediye Spor in the Turkish Women's Football Super League.

Early years
Rashida Marie Beal was born in Germantown, Wisconsin, United States on November 18, 1994. She performed track athletics in the middle school. She finished Germantown High School in 2013. She studied Psychology with minor in Neuroscience at the University of Minnesota graduating in December 2016.

Club career

High school and college teams
Beal played two years for Germantown High School team, and four years for North Shore United AFC. She played college soccer for the Minnesota Golden Gophers. She was named Academic All-District in 2014 and 2015 and was selected to the NSCAA Scholar All-Region (Central) in 2015. In November 2016, she was named a First Team Academic All-American. She enjoyed the champion title of the Big Ten Women's Soccer Tournament in 2016. She was named the 2016 Big Ten Defender of the Year.

FC Kansas City
After finishing the college, she was drafted by FC Kansas City in January 2017. Beal played soccer as a professional in her country 's National Women's Soccer League.

BV Cloppenburg (Germany)
Between February and June 2020, she was with the 2. Frauen-Bundesliga club BV Cloppenburg in Germany. By February 2021, she was called up to Kansas City NWSL for the 2021 Preseason.

FCU Olimpia Cluj (Romania)
In August 2021, she transferred to the Romanian league champion club FCU Olimpia Cluj to play in the 2021–22 UEFA Women's Champions League qualifying rounds. She appeared in two matches.

Kdz. Ereğli Belediye Spor (Turkey)
In the beginning of 2022, she moved to Turkey and joined Kdz. Ereğli Belediye Spor to play in the second half of the 2021-22 Women's Super League.

Honours

Club
Big Ten Women's Soccer Tournament
Minnesota Golden Gophers
 Champions (1): 2016
Big Ten Women's League Winners

Individual
Minnesota Golden Gophers
 Academic All-District (2014, 2015)
 NSCAA Scholar All-Region (Central) (2015)
 First Team Academic All-American (2016)
  2016 Big Ten Defender of the Year 
  First Team All-Great Lakes Region 
  First Team All-Big Ten
  Second Team All-American

References

1994 births
Living people
People from Germantown, Wisconsin
Soccer players from Wisconsin
University of Minnesota alumni
American women's soccer players
Women's association football defenders
Minnesota Golden Gophers women's soccer players
FC Kansas City draft picks
American expatriate women's soccer players
American expatriate soccer players in Germany
BV Cloppenburg (women) players
Expatriate women's footballers in Romania
American expatriate sportspeople in Romania
FC Universitatea Cluj players
Expatriate women's footballers in Turkey
American expatriate sportspeople in Turkey
Turkish Women's Football Super League players
Karadeniz Ereğlispor players
African-American women's soccer players